Mitteldeutscher Rundfunk (MDR; Central German Broadcasting) is the public broadcaster for the federal states of Thuringia, Saxony and Saxony-Anhalt in Germany.  Established in January 1991, its headquarters are in Leipzig, with regional studios in Dresden, Erfurt and Magdeburg. MDR is a member of the ARD consortium of public broadcasters in Germany.

MDR broadcasts its own television channel to the three states it serves and also contributes programming to the first German TV channel (Das Erste), and broadcasts a number of radio channels.

History

Origins

The Mitteldeutsche Rundfunk AG (MIRAG) was founded on 22 January 1924 in Leipzig. It aired its first program on 1 March 1924 at 14:30 CET.

During the Gleichschaltung in the Nazi era, the MIRAG was transferred to the "Reichssender Leipzig" in 1934.

After the end of the Second World War, the Soviet Military Administration in Germany temporarily licensed "Radio Leipzig" in 1945, which only existed for a few months until the Mitteldeutscher Rundfunk was founded again. In 1946 the new program "Mitteldeutscher Rundfunk, Sender Leipzig" started in the Springerstrasse broadcasting house.

In September 1952, the "Sender Leipzig" program was converted to the "Berlin III" entertainment program. In 1956 the regional program of Radio DDR (English: Radio GDR), "Sender Leipzig", was introduced.

On 31 May 1991, Mitteldeutscher Rundfunk (MDR) was founded as public broadcaster serving Saxony, Saxony-Anhalt and Thuringia, and became a member of ARD.

In August 2022 Ines Hoge-Lorenz, the managing director of the regional state branch of Saxony-Anhalt of the MDR was sacked because of her family ties to a corruption scandal ten years ago.

Studios and staff 

MDR has approximately 2,000 employees. The main television studio is in Leipzig, and the main radio studio is in Halle. There are also radio and TV studios in each of the three state capitals for the territory that MDR represents: Dresden (Saxony), Erfurt (Thuringia), and Magdeburg (Saxony-Anhalt).

Finances 
In 2012 87% of MDR's total annual income of €684,529,979 was derived from the licence fees payable by all households at the rate of €17,50 (per month). 
These fees are not collected directly by MDR but by the Beitragsservice ("fee collection service") owned jointly by ARD (and its members), the second television network ZDF, and the national radio broadcaster Deutschlandradio.

TV and radio channels 
MDR produces programming independently and in collaboration with other broadcasters, for transmission by a number of television and radio networks.

Television channels 
 MDR Fernsehen – third TV channel for central Germany, with regional programming for Saxony, Saxony-Anhalt and Thuringia

MDR also contributes programming to the following:
 Das Erste – Germany's main public TV network
 Phoenix – a station mainly broadcasting documentaries, special events and discussions, jointly run by ARD and ZDF
 KiKa – children's network jointly run by ARD and ZDF
 arte – a Franco-German cultural channel
 3sat – cultural network from ARD, ZDF, ORF (Austrian Broadcasting), and SRG (Swiss Broadcasting)

Radio channels 
 MDR Sachsen (MDR Saxony) – regional programming for Saxony
 MDR Sachsen-Anhalt (MDR Saxony-Anhalt) – regional programming for Saxony-Anhalt
 MDR Thüringen (MDR Thuringia) – regional programming for Thuringia
 MDR Jump – pop music 
 MDR Kultur – culture & spoken word programming and regional classical music
 MDR Aktuell – 24h news and information (AM broadcasts ceased on 30 April 2013)
 MDR Sputnik – youth oriented music station. Formerly DT64 cultural youth channel of East German broadcasting organisation. (FM in Saxony-Anhalt only, internet, DAB+ elsewhere)
 MDR Klassik (DAB+ and internet streaming only) – classical music
 MDR Schlagerwelt (DAB+ and internet streaming only) – schlager music and easy listening
 MDR Tweens (DAB+ and internet streaming only) – children's programming

Musical organizations 
The MDR operates two musical organizations and a ballet corps.

The MDR Symphony Orchestra (German: MDR Sinfonieorchester) was founded in 1915 as "Orchester des Konzertvereins" ("Orchestra of the Concert Society"). It became the "Rundfunk-Sinfonieorchester Leipzig" ("Radio Symphony Orchestra Leipzig") in 1924. Principal conductors have included Herbert Kegel, Wolf-Dieter Hauschild, Daniel Nazareth and Fabio Luisi.  Since September 2007, Jun Märkl is the orchestra's principal conductor.

The later MDR Rundfunkchor (MDR radio choir) was founded in 1946 as the Rundfunkchor Leipzig ("Leipzig Radio Choir").

The MDR managed MDR TV Ballet (German: MDR Fernsehballett), the only TV ballet company in Europe. It was founded in 1962 as DFF-Fernsehballet, reorganized in 1992, and has 30 members. MDR sold the Ballet in 2012. It's now known as Deutsches Fernsehballett.

Transmitters 
MDR does not own its own transmission towers. They are owned and operated by Deutsche Telekom.

Podcasts 
Several podcasts produced by MDR are available through the iTunes Music Store and via RSS. They are essentially repeats of regular radio programmes, including: "Figaro," "MDR Info," "Programming Highlights," "Riverboat," "Sputnik" and "Unter uns."

Administration 

Popular MDR productions 
MDR produces several programs for the ARD, including crime drama episodes for the series Tatort ("Crime Scene") and Polizeiruf 110 ("Police Emergency 110"). MDR also produces the successful hospital series In aller Freundschaft ("In friendship") and the animal series Abenteuer Zoo ("Adventure Zoo"), Deutschlands wilde Tiere ("Germany's Wild Animals") and Europas wilder Osten ("Europe's Wild East").

See also
 German television
 List of high rise buildings in Leipzig

References

Further reading

External links

  

 
ARD (broadcaster)
Mass media companies of Germany
Television networks in Germany
Television stations in Germany
Radio stations in Germany
German-language television networks
German news websites
Television channels and stations established in 1991
Mass media in Leipzig
1991 establishments in Germany